The lists of people from London, England is divided by London borough. A person from London is known as a Londoner.

Further reading